Monapo District is a district of Nampula Province in north-eastern Mozambique. The principal town is Monapo.

Further reading
District profile (PDF) 

Districts in Nampula Province